Käkirahu is an island in Väinameri strait and belongs to the country of Estonia. Island is 57 m long and has territory of 170 m2 .

See also
 List of islands of Estonia

References

Islands of Estonia
Hiiumaa Parish